Sonja Katharina Eichwede (born 25 October 1987) is a German lawyer and politician representing the Social Democratic Party of Germany. She was elected to the Bundestag in the 2021 German federal election.

Life 
Eichwede was born in Bremen. After graduating, she studied Jurisprudence at the University of Tübingen, graduating in 2013. As part of her studies, she completed an Erasmus exchange in Oslo in 2010. In 2013, Eichwede passed the first German state examination in law, and following this worked as a trainee lawyer at the Landgericht Bremen until 2015.

Political career 
Eichwede stood as a candidate in the 2021 federal elections for the Brandenburg an der Havel – Potsdam-Mittelmark I – Havelland III – Teltow-Fläming I constituency in Brandenburg. She won a direct mandate with 32.1% of first preference votes, beating Christian Democratic Union candidate Dietlind Tiemann, among others.

In parliament, Eichwede has since been serving on the Committee on the Scrutiny of Elections, Immunity and the Rules of Procedure. She also serves on the Committee on the Election of Judges (Wahlausschuss), which is in charge of appointing judges to the Federal Constitutional Court of Germany, and on the parliamentary body in charge of appointing judges to the Highest Courts of Justice, namely the Federal Court of Justice (BGH), the Federal Administrative Court (BVerwG), the Federal Fiscal Court (BFH), the Federal Labour Court (BAG), and the Federal Social Court (BSG). She has been her parliamentary group’s spokesperson for legal affairs.

Personal life 
According to Eichwede, she is single, and an evangelical Christian.

References

External links
Official website (in German)

1987 births
Living people
Social Democratic Party of Germany politicians
21st-century German politicians
Members of the Bundestag for Brandenburg
Female members of the Bundestag
21st-century German women politicians